Party of the United Struggle for Africans in Angola (in Portuguese: Partido da Luta Unida dos Africanos de Angola; abbreviated: PLUA) is the first political party in Angola to advocate Angolan independence from Portugal, campaigning from its founding in 1953 until it merged with the Angolan Communist Party (PCA) to form the People's Movement for the Liberation of Angola (MPLA) in December 1956.

References

Defunct political parties in Angola
Angolan nationalism
MPLA
Portuguese Angola
Political parties established in 1953
1953 establishments in Angola
Political parties disestablished in 1956
1956 disestablishments in Angola